Munich Donnersbergerbrücke station is a station with four platform tracks in the Schwanthalerhöhe district of the Bavarian state capital of Munich and a hub of the Munich S-Bahn. Here line S 7 separates towards Wolfratshausen from the S-Bahn trunk line. It is also served by services of the Bayerische Oberlandbahn on the Munich–Holzkirchen railway on the S-Bahn trunk line.

History
München-Hauptwerkstätte station was opened on 1 September 1895 at the site of the now four-track station served by the S-Bahn and the Bayerische Oberlandbahn (BOB), adjacent to the workshop of the Deutsche Reichsbahn and its forerunners that it was named after. In the 1920s, it was renamed Zentralwerkstätte (central workshop). Only at 23 May 1971, that is one year before the launch of the Munich S-Bahn on 28 May 1972, the station was given its present name. At the beginning of the S-Bahn operations there were only two platform tracks with a central platform located where there is now green space between tracks 2 and 3. At the end of the 1970s, the two current platforms were built and put into operation on 31 May 1981 at the same time as the Southern lines tunnel (Südstreckentunnel) was built for connecting the Munich–Holzkirchen railway and line S 7 from Wolfratshausen. As a result, this line, which as line S 10 previously ended at Munich Central Station (Hauptbahnhof), was connected with the S-Bahn trunk line tunnel. The Southern line tunnel has been used since 1998 by the Bayerische Oberlandbahn. Using a flying junction to the east of the station, it is possible for the BOB services and S-Bahn line S 27 to continue to the northern wing station of the Hauptbahnhof (also’ known as the Starnberger Flügelbahnhof—“Starnberg Wing Station”).

Infrastructure
Platform track 1 is used by S-Bahn lines 1 to 6 and 8 running out of the city. The next station is Hirschgarten. The Bayerische Oberlandbahn and lines S 7 and S 27 heading out of the city stop on track 2. Immediately after the platform these services pass under all the other tracks towards the Central Station in a tunnel in order, after a long left turn and the crossing of Landsbergerstraße, to reach Heimeranplatz station where it is possible to transfer to U-Bahn lines U 4 and U 5. Track 3 is used by all S-Bahn services from Laim/Pasing. Track 4, similarly to track 2, is used by BOB and S-Bahn services on lines S 7 and S 27 towards the city. Both central platforms are 210 metres long and 96 cm high. 
 
The platforms are linked by a separate bridge west of the platforms. This bridge is also connected to the Donnersbergerbrücke, where the buses on lines 53, 133 and N99 stop.

Rail services

The station is served by S-Bahn lines S1, S2, S3, S4, S6, S7 and S8, each operating at 20-minute intervals. It is also served by some services of the Bayerische Regiobahn.

Vicinity
A new housing development, the Arnulfpark, is being built northeast of the Donnersbergerbrücke.
Southwest to the station is the main customs office, with its distinctive dome.

Gallery

References

External links

Donnersbergerbrucke
Donnersbergerbrucke
Railway stations in Germany opened in 1895